Štramberk ears is a Moravian confectionery product made of cone-shaped gingerbread dough traditionally baked in the Štramberk and the surrounding area of Moravia. This product could be officially made and sold only at the town area since 2000. In 2006 there were six certified producers. In 2007 this sweet became protected designation of origin in EU as first in the Czech Republic.

Legend of the origin
According to local legend, in the 13th century, during the Tatar invasion, the inhabitants from the whole area found refuge on Kotouč Mountain, where the Tatars attacked them several times. During the last attack, a storm broke out and flooded the pond above the Tatars' lair, which the local inhabitants took advantage of by digging a dam in the pond and thus flushing out the Tatars.
They then found several sacks of ears in the flooded camp, which the Tartars had cut off from the slaughtered Christians. The so-called "Štramberk ears" are baked in Štramberk to commemorate this event.

External links
History of the sweet at the town website (in Czech)

Czech cuisine
Moravia